Marguerite Martel (born 19 July 1924) is a French former athlete. She competed in the women's long jump at the 1948 Summer Olympics.

References

External links
 

1924 births
Living people
Athletes (track and field) at the 1948 Summer Olympics
French female long jumpers
Olympic athletes of France